Nyctimystes traunae  is a species of tree frog in the subfamily Pelodryadinae, endemic to Papua New Guinea.  It lives on mountains in the centre of the island in the Western Highlands Province.  Scientists have seen it about 800 meters above sea level.

Original description

References

Amphibians described in 2014
traunae
Endemic fauna of New Guinea
Amphibians of Papua New Guinea